Bernd Aldor (23 March 1881 – 20 October 1950) was a German stage and film actor. Aldor was a leading star of German cinema during the 1910s and 1920s. He appeared regularly in the films of Richard Oswald and Lupu Pick, often in detective thrillers. Aldor also notably appeared in the 1917 social enlightenment film Let There Be Light.

Selected filmography
 The Picture of Dorian Gray (1917)
 Let There Be Light (1917)
 The Lord of Hohenstein (1917)
 The Mirror of the World (1918)
 Madame Récamier (1920)
 The Fear of Women (1921)
 Count Cohn (1923)
 The Misanthrope (1923)
 Orient Fever (1923)
 The Affair of Baroness Orlovska (1923)
 The Doomed (1924)
 Semi-Silk (1925)
 Ash Wednesday (1925)
 The Old Fritz (1928)
 Indizienbeweis (1929)
 Vendetta (1929)
 Dreyfus (1930)
 Two People (1930)
 Elisabeth of Austria (1931)

References

Bibliography
 Kay Weniger: 'Es wird im Leben dir mehr genommen als gegeben …'. Lexikon der aus Deutschland und Österreich emigrierten Filmschaffenden 1933 bis 1945. Eine Gesamtübersicht. p. 68, Acabus-Verlag, Hamburg 2011, 
 Rogowski, Christian. The Many Faces of Weimar cinema: Rediscovering Germany's Filmic Legacy. Camden House, 2010.

External links

1881 births
1950 deaths
German male film actors
German male silent film actors
German male stage actors
Male actors from Istanbul
Jewish German male actors
20th-century German male actors